While My Heart Beats is the second studio album by the American musician Jeff Ament. It is his second solo album apart from his main band, Pearl Jam, preceded by 2008's Tone.

Background
The album was recorded between April 2009 and May 2011 at Horseback Court, Ament's studio in Blue Mountain, Montana. Frequent Ament collaborator Richard Stuverud performed drumming duties on most of the album; Ament's Pearl Jam bandmate Matt Cameron drummed for two tracks, "When the Fire Comes" and "War in Your Eyes". Additional guitar work was done on "When the Fire Comes" and "War in Your Eyes" by Pearl Jam's Mike McCready. Joseph Arthur, Ament's bandmate from RNDM, provided the vocals for "When the Fire Comes".

Track listing
All songs were written by Jeff Ament.
"Ulcers & the Apocalypse" - 3:14
"When the Fire Comes" - 3:27
"War in Your Eyes" - 3:48
"While My Heart Beats" - 6:36
"Shout and Repeat" - 2:38
"Give It a Name" - 2:31
"The Answers" - 3:36
"Time to Pay" - 2:26
"Take My Hand" - 2:58
"Down to Sleep" - 4:16
"Never Forget" - 2:52

Personnel
Jeff Ament – all instruments (unless otherwise noted), additional recording

Additional musicians and production
Richard Stuverud – drums
Mike McCready - "Atmospheric" guitar on "When the Fire Comes" and "The Answers"
Matt Cameron - drums on "When the Fire Comes" and "War in Your Eyes"
Joseph Arthur – lead vocals on "When the Fire Comes"
Brett Eliason – recording, mixing
Ed Brooks – mastering at RMI
John Burton, Floyd Reitsma – additional recording
Regan Hagar - Layout
Don Pendleton - Logo, cover & back paintings
Inside photo by P.

External links
 pjcollectors.com
 pearljam.com

Jeff Ament albums
2012 albums